Teodora Injac (born 6 May 2000) is a Serbian chess player. She was awarded the title of Woman Grandmaster in 2021.

Chess career 
She won the Women's Serbian Chess Championship in 2018, 2019 and 2020.

She represented Serbia in the 2018 Chess Olympiad.

She qualified for the Women's Chess World Cup 2021 where, seeded 63rd, she defeated Dina Belenkaya 2-0 in the first round, before being defeated by 2nd-seed Kateryna Lagno 1.5-0.5 in the second round.

References

External links
 
 
 

2000 births
Living people
Sportspeople from Belgrade
Chess woman grandmasters
Serbian female chess players
Chess Olympiad competitors